Rozhnovsky is a rural locality (a khutor) in Filonovskoye Rural Settlement, Novoanninsky District, Volgograd Oblast, Russia. The population was 312 as of 2010. There are 8 streets.

Geography 
Rozhnovsky is located on the Khopyorsko-Buzulukskaya Plain, on the left bank of the Buzuluk River, 19 km northeast of Novoanninsky (the district's administrative centre) by road. Salomatin is the nearest rural locality.

References 

Rural localities in Novoanninsky District